Nørager Municipality is a former municipality (Danish, kommune) in Region Nordjylland on the Jutland peninsula in northern Denmark. The former Nørager municipality covered an area of 168 km², and had a total population of 5,565 (2005). Its last mayor was Poul Larsen, a member of the Conservative People's Party (Det Konservative Folkeparti) political party.
On January 1, 2007 Nørager municipality ceased to exist as the result of Kommunalreformen ("The Municipality Reform" of 2007). It was merged with Skørping and Støvring municipalities to form the new Rebild Municipality. This created a municipality with an area of 628 km² and a total population of 28,457 (2005).

Mayors of Nørager 

Former municipalities of Denmark